Waldemar Heigenhauser (born 24 May 1939) is an Austrian skier. He competed in the Nordic combined events at the 1964 Winter Olympics and the 1968 Winter Olympics.

References

External links
 

1939 births
Living people
Austrian male Nordic combined skiers
Olympic Nordic combined skiers of Austria
Nordic combined skiers at the 1964 Winter Olympics
Nordic combined skiers at the 1968 Winter Olympics
People from Saalfelden
Sportspeople from Salzburg (state)